640 AM - The following radio stations broadcast on AM frequency 640 kHz: 640 AM is a North American clear-channel frequency. KFI in Los Angeles, California, KYUK in Bethel, Alaska, and CBN in St. John's, Newfoundland and Labrador, Canada share Class A status of 640 AM.

In Argentina 
 LRA24 in Río Grande, Tierra del Fuego
 LU18 in General Roca, Río Negro
 LV15 in Villa Mercedes, San Luis

In Bolivia 
 CP 157 in Milluni

In Brazil 
 ZYH458 in Itabuna
 ZYH-757 in Goiânia
 ZYI-240 in Vitória·
 ZYI-418 in Alta Floresta
 ZYJ262 in Londrina
 ZYJ-489 in Resende
 ZYJ590 in Natal, Rio Grande do Norte
 ZYK-277 in Porto Alegre
 ZYK-547 in Araraquara
 ZYL-308 in Para de Minas

In Canada 
Stations in bold are clear-channel stations.

In Chile 
 CA-064 in Curico
 CD-064 in Temuco

In Costa Rica 
 TIQQ in San José

In Colombia 
 HJBJ in Santa Marta
 HJR32 Bucaramanga

In Cuba 
 CMLA in Victoria de Las Tunas

In Ecuador 
 HCXY1 in Quito

In France

In Guadeloupe 
 FFQ in Point-à-Pitre

In Guatemala 
 TGW in Guatemala City

In Honduras 
 HRNN4 in Tegucigalpa

In Mexico 
 XEJUA-AM in Cd. Juárez, Chihuahua
 XENQ-AM in Tulancingo, Hidalgo
 XETAM-AM in Santa Elena, Tamaulipas

In Panama 
 HOK 22 in Colón

In Paraguay 
 ZP 19 in Coronel Oviedo

In Peru 
 OAZ4K in Lima

In the United States 
Stations in bold are clear-channel stations.

In Venezuela 
 YVSI in Maracaibo
 YVQO in Puerto La Cruz

See also

CONELRAD

References

Lists of radio stations by frequency